Lucy Angela Hughes-Hallett (born 7 December 1951) is a British cultural historian, biographer and novelist. In November 2013, she won the Samuel Johnson Prize for nonfiction for her biography of the Italian writer  Gabriele D'Annunzio, The Pike. The book also won the 2013 Costa Book Award (Biography) and the Duff Cooper Prize.

Biography
Lucy Hughes-Hallett has written three works of nonfiction: Cleopatra, Heroes and The Pike: Gabriele d'Annunzio. 
She has also written a novel, Peculiar Ground, set partly in the 1660s and partly during the Cold War. In her collection of short stories, Fabulous, she reimagines stories from classical mythology, the Bible, and folklore, setting them in modern Britain.

Hughes-Hallett was a Vogue Talent Contest prizewinner in 1973 and subsequently worked for five years as a feature writer on the magazine. In 1978 she won the Catherine Pakenham Award for Young Female Journalists for a profile of Roald Dahl. Since then she has written on books and arts for all of the British broadsheet newspapers including The Sunday Times and The Guardian. She was television critic of the London Evening Standard for five years.

She has judged the WH Smith Award, The Duff Cooper Prize, The Encore Award, the RSL Jerwood Award, the Rathbones Prize, and the Hawthornden Prize.

In 2021 she was the Chair of the Judges of the International Booker Prize.

She is a fellow of the Royal Society of Literature and an Honorary Fellow of the Historical Association.

In 1984, she married publisher Dan Franklin. They have two daughters.

Selected publications
 Hughes-Hallett, L. (1990). Cleopatra: Histories, Dreams and Distortions. New York: Harper & Row.
 Hughes-Hallett, L. (2004). Heroes: Saviours, Traitors and Supermen. London: Harper Press; Heroes (no subtitle), New York: Alfred A. Knopf
 Hughes-Hallett, L. (2013). The Pike: Gabriele D'Annunzio, Poet, Seducer and Preacher of War, London: Fourth Estate; Gabriele d'Annunzio: Poet, Seducer, and Preacher of War, New York: Alfred A. Knopf 
 Hughes-Hallett, L. (2017). Peculiar Ground: A Novel, London: Fourth Estate
 Hughes-Hallett, L. (2019). Fabulous: Stories, London: Fourth Estate

References

1951 births
Living people
Fellows of the Royal Society of Literature
Alumni of the University of London
People educated at St Mary's School, Calne